Amucallia is a genus of longhorn beetles of the subfamily Lamiinae.

 Amucallia colombiana Galileo & Martins, 2010
 Amucallia hovorei Galileo & Martins, 2008
 Amucallia miranda Galileo & Martins, 2010
 Amucallia venezuelensis Galileo & Martins, 2010

References

Calliini
Cerambycidae genera